Kabeiro rubroreticulata is a species of sea slug, a dendronotid nudibranch, a marine gastropod mollusc in the family Dotidae.

Distribution
This species was described from Panglao, Bohol Island, Philippines. It is also known from Bali, Indonesia.

Description
The body of this dendronotid nudibranch is variable in colour from cream through brown to red, with a fine reticulation of red pigment on the sides, back and on the rhinophore sheaths. The cerata are irregular in shape with pseudobranchs on the inner faces. The maximum length of this species is 20 mm.

EcologyKabeiro rubroreticulata'' is found on colonies of Campanulariid hydroids which grow on sea grass in 1–5 m depth.

References

Dotidae
Gastropods described in 2015